S12, SB12, SM12 are disability swimming classifications used for categorising swimmers based on their level of disability.

History
The classification was created by the International Paralympic Committee  and has roots in a 2003 attempt to address "the overall objective to support and co-ordinate the ongoing development of accurate, reliable, consistent and credible sport focused classification systems and their implementation."

For the 2016 Summer Paralympics in Rio, the International Paralympic Committee had a zero classification at the Games policy.  This policy was put into place in 2014, with the goal of avoiding last minute changes in classes that would negatively impact athlete training preparations. All competitors needed to be internationally classified with their classification status confirmed prior to the Games, with exceptions to this policy being dealt with on a case-by-case basis.

Sport
This classification is for swimming. In the classification title, S represents Freestyle, Backstroke and Butterfly strokes. SB means breaststroke. SM means individual medley. Jane Buckley, writing for the Sporting Wheelies, describes the swimmers in this classification as follows: "These swimmers can recognise the shape of a hand and have some ability to see.
There is a large range of vision ability within this class."

Getting classified
Internationally, the classification is done by the International Blind Sports Association. In Australia, to be classified in this category, athletes contact the Australian Paralympic Committee or their state swimming governing body.  In the United States, classification is handled by the United States Paralympic Committee on a national level. The classification test has three components: "a bench test, a water test, observation during competition."  American swimmers are assessed by four people: a medical classifier, two general classifier and a technical classifier.

Competitions
For this classification, organisers of the Paralympic Games have the option of including the following events on the Paralympic programme: 50m, 100m and 400m Freestyle, 100m Backstroke, 100m Breaststroke, 100m Butterfly, 200m Individual Medley, and  Freestyle Relay and  Medley Relay.

Competitors
Swimmers who have competed in this classification include Anna Efimenko, Deborah Font and Ana Garcia-Arcicollar who all won medals in their class at the 2008 Paralympics.

American swimmers who have been classified by the United States Paralympic Committee as being in this class include Katie Robinson, Alexandra Stafford and Carly Stevason.

Records
In the S12 50 m Freestyle Long Course, the men's world record is held by the Ukraine's Maksym Veraksa and the women's world record is held by Russia's Oxana Savchenko. In the S12 100 m Freestyle Long Course, the men's world record is held by Ukraine's Maksym Veraksa  and the women's world record is held by Russia's Oxana Savchenko.

See also

 Para-swimming classification
 Swimming at the Summer Paralympics

References

Swimming at the Summer Paralympics
Parasports classifications